Vespers is an interactive fiction game written in 2005 by Jason Devlin that placed first at the 2005 Interactive Fiction Competition. It also won the XYZZY Awards for Best Game, Best NPCs, Best Setting, and Best Writing.

Summary

Set in a 15th-century Italian monastery, it is chiefly a horror-themed morality game, where the player takes moral decisions, which then affect the ending. However, whilst playing the game, it isn't obvious that these are moral dilemmas, and the game actively encourages the player to take the evil path.

Awards

Vespers has won the following awards: 

1st place, rec.arts.int-fiction competition 2005
Finalist, Best Individual PC, Xyzzy Awards 2005
Winner, Best NPCs, Xyzzy Awards 2005
Winner, Best Setting, Xyzzy Awards 2005
Winner, Best Writing, Xyzzy Awards 2005
Winner, Best Game, Xyzzy Awards 2005
Finalist, Best Individual NPC, Xyzzy Awards 2005
Finalist, Best Puzzles, Xyzzy Awards 2005
Finalist, Best Story, Xyzzy Awards 2005

Remake

Vespers3D is an in-progress remake of the game created using the Torque Game Engine. The written text interface is being carried over from the original but the remake team are adding 3D animated graphics, voice acting and music.

References

External links
 Baf's Guide entry
 Review of Vespers in SPAG

2000s interactive fiction
2005 video games
Video games set in the 15th century